Mood in Scarlet is an album by Les Modes led by horn player Julius Watkins and saxophonist Charlie Rouse recorded in 1956 and released on the Dawn label.

Reception

AllMusic awarded the album 2 stars

Track listing
All compositions by Julius Watkins except as indicated
 "Baubles, Bangles and Beads" (Robert Wright, George Forrest, Alexander Borodin) - 2:43		
 "Autumn Leaves" (Joseph Kosma, Jacques Prévert, Johnny Mercer) - 5:14		
 "The Golden Chariot" (Gildo Mahones) - 2:45		
 "Let's Try (Charles Isaiah Darwin, Paulette Girard) - 3:18		
 "Bohemia" (Ed Smollett, Charles E. Shirley, Mynell Allen) - 3:26		
 "Catch Her" - 2:40		
 "Hoo Tai" - 6:27		
 "Moon in Scarlet" - 5:11		
 "Linda Delia" (George Butcher) - 4:18		
 "I've Got You Under My Skin" (Cole Porter) - 3:23 Bonus track on CD reissue		
 "We Can Talk It Over" - 3:21 Bonus track on CD reissue

Personnel
Julius Watkins - French horn
Charlie Rouse - tenor saxophone
Gildo Mahones - piano 
Martin Rivera - bass
Ron Jefferson - drums
Chino Pozo - congas, bongos  (tracks 5 & 6)
Eileen Gilbert - vocals (tracks 7 & 8)

References

Charlie Rouse albums
Julius Watkins albums
1958 albums